Igor Vasilyevich Ivanov (January 8, 1947 – November 17, 2005) was a Russian-born Canadian grandmaster of chess and a concert pianist.

Early life 
He was born in 1947 in Leningrad, USSR, and learned chess at age five. He studied music intensively as a youth, specializing in piano, and was very talented.  He was orphaned at age 14 when his mother died; she had wanted him to become a concert performer. He essentially gave up this path to concentrate on chess. Ivanov studied Mathematics at Leningrad State University, but left before completing his degree. He was a member of the Army Sports Club, for which he trained chessplayers, and also played extensively. For several years in the early to mid-1970s, he was part of the exceptionally deep class of Soviet masters which was just below international standard. Ivanov did qualify for the 1975 Soviet Championship First League; this event, with several grandmasters in the field, was still one stage below the top level at that time.

Ivanov took an opportunity to represent Uzbekistan, a central Asian Soviet republic, and to be a professional player there. Several victories in strong Soviet events soon followed, such as Vladivostok 1978, Yaroslavl 1979, and Ashkhabad 1979. He tied for the second place in the Soviet Championship Otborochnii (qualifying tournament) held at Daugavpils, Latvia, in 1978. But for the 64 players, only one place was open to the Soviet Championship Premier League, and it was Garry Kasparov (future World Champion). Ivanov thus again qualified for the First League of 1979.

Ivanov first became internationally famous later in 1979, when he defeated World Champion Anatoly Karpov in a superb game from the USSR Spartakiad team tournament. This likely earned him the privilege of his first international travel, very difficult for Soviet citizens to obtain during those years.

Defection to Canada 
In 1980, he became even more famous for defecting in a dramatic way. He was sent as a member of a Soviet delegation to play chess at the José Raúl Capablanca Memorial tournament in Havana, Cuba. On what was supposed to have been a direct flight home to Moscow, the airplane, a Czechoslovak airliner, had to make an emergency refueling stop in Gander, Newfoundland, Canada. Ivanov, seizing his chance, ran from the plane with only what he was wearing and his pocket chess set, while chased by KGB agents. Ivanov was granted political asylum in Canada. At this stage, he was untitled and rated 2430, but soon proved he was much stronger.

New Canadian star 
Ivanov settled in Montreal. His first significant tournament win in Canada was the 1980 Quebec Open Championship in Montreal, where he made an undefeated 7/8, to finish half a point ahead of Kevin Spraggett, who he defeated in their head-to-head game. 

Ivanov then won the 1981 Zonal Canadian Chess Championship also held there, earning the International Master title, and qualified for the World Championship cycle the next year. He went on to win the Championship of Canada four times in all, including three straight years from 1985-1987. He won the Canadian Open Chess Championship three times, in 1981, 1984, and 1985. For the 1981 Meran World Championship match, he seconded challenger Viktor Korchnoi.

At the 1982 Toluca Interzonal, Ivanov narrowly missed advancing as a Candidate, finishing in fourth place. Later that year, he represented Canada on top board at the Lucerne Chess Olympiad, and defeated top grandmasters Jan Timman and Tony Miles. He also played for Canada in the 1988 Chess Olympiad in Thessaloniki. Although he was clearly a player of grandmaster strength, he did not actually receive the title until the last year of his life, 2005. This delay was caused mainly by bookkeeping issues, and by the Soviet federation refusing to recognize his earlier achievements after he defected.

While remaining a Canadian citizen, Ivanov moved for most of the year to the United States, and participated in the Grand Prix tournaments called the "Church's Chicken Circuit" in the early 1980s, to be able to compete more often. He traveled around the US mostly by bus, playing in small and medium-sized chess tournaments nearly every weekend, which he very often won, as well as many major American events. He won nine first prizes, usually $10,000, for most Grand Prix points in a year, and was one of the most active players in the country. Ivanov resided in Utah with his wife Elizabeth, a retired teacher who was at one time a distinguished chess player herself. He won the Utah Open and the Utah Championship titles every time he competed, and personally trained many of Utah's top chess players, including virtuoso and prodigy Kayden William Troff, who is one of the strongest for his age in the country, and is top in Utah in many categories. Ivanov was finally awarded the Grandmaster title in 2005.

Illness, death 
Ivanov was diagnosed with cancer in March 2005. The Professional Players' Health and Benefit Fund of the United States Chess Federation had been giving him financial support for his chemotherapy treatments. In August 2005, three months before his death, he tied for eighth place at the U.S. Open Chess Championship in Phoenix, Arizona against some of the best players in the country.

Ivanov died on November 17, 2005, in St. George, Utah. He played in the Utah Open on October 29, 2005, only three weeks before his death, finishing in a tie for first place.

Notable chess games 
Igor Ivanov vs Vladimir Bagirov, USSR Championship Qualifying tournament, Cheliabinsk 1975, Queen's Gambit Declined (D30), 1–0 In a sharp tactical battle, Ivanov shows his talent by defeating an experienced grandmaster.
Igor Ivanov vs Anatoly Karpov, USSR Spartakiade 1979, Sicilian Defense, Kan Variation (B43), 1–0 The almost unknown Ivanov takes care of the World Champion in a sharp game with virtually perfect play.
Kevin Spraggett vs Igor Ivanov, Quebec Open, Montreal 1980, Nimzo-Indian Defence, Rubinstein Variation (E41), 0–1 After defecting, Ivanov is the new guy in Montreal, and makes his presence felt immediately with a win over one of Canada's top players.
Igor Ivanov vs Eugenio Torre, Toluca Interzonal 1982, Queen's Gambit Declined, Slav Defence (D14), 1–0 Far from being overawed in such lofty company, Ivanov makes a very strong bid to advance as a Candidate, defeating one of the players who would, in fact, play in that Candidates' cycle.
Igor Ivanov vs Jan Timman, Lucerne Olympiad 1982, English Opening, Symmetrical Variation (A35), 1–0 Ivanov takes off one of the world's top players in a positional squeeze.
Igor Ivanov vs Anthony Miles, Lucerne Olympiad 1982, English Opening, Symmetrical Variation (A30), 1–0 England's top player has to concede defeat after being outmaneuvered, as Ivanov invests in a very deep pawn sacrifice to break Black's coordination, then follows up by sacrificing a bishop for a glorious conclusion.
Maxim Dlugy vs Igor Ivanov, Las Vegas 1994, Modern Defence, Averbakh Variation (A42), 0–1 Ivanov makes fairly quick work of another Soviet emigre GM.
Pavel Blatny vs Igor Ivanov, U.S. Open, Reno 1999, Reti Opening (A05), 0–1 A quiet struggle gradually intensifies into a tactical battle where Ivanov sees further.

See also
 List of Eastern Bloc defectors

References 

Igor Ivanov – Grandmaster and pianist from Chessbase News 
 from the New York Times

External links 
 
 
 
 
 
 

1947 births
2005 deaths
Soviet chess players
Canadian chess players
Chess grandmasters
Naturalized citizens of Canada
Soviet defectors
Soviet pianists
Sportspeople from Saint Petersburg
Soviet emigrants to Canada
20th-century pianists
20th-century chess players
Deaths from cancer in Utah